The Chirnside Park Football Club is an Australian rules football club located in Chirnside Park, Victoria. They play in Division 4 of the Eastern Football League.

History

The mighty Panthers were founded in 1978 to cater for the expanding number of juniors wanting to learn to play football. Chirnside Park first fielded a senior side in the year 2000, competing in division four. Chirnside Park won the senior premiership in fourth division in 2009 with ex Warburton-Millgrove champion Jason Degraaf coaching the club. The senior premiership coming just one year after the success of the colts premiership in 2008. Stephen Pepping is the club's most decorated player and some consider the greatest player to have ever played in Division 4.

Chirnside Park have competed in the third division or the Eastern Football League since 2010. A league restructure (from four divisions to five divisions) by the Eastern Football League in 2019 moved Chirnside Park from division three to division four. This being the first year the club changed divisions since the inaugural Premiership in 2009 after it was decided the bottom six teams from division three would be relegated to make up the new division four.

The club is proud of its history and works hard to keep junior programs operating at a level which ensures the juniors coming through are able to enjoy football and improve over their journey. This dedication to the junior program keeps the club strong and feeds the senior teams. The club is very proud to have multiple women's football teams representing the club as it aims to build on and expand with women's football as it continues to grow.

References

External links
 Official Chirnside Park Football Club website
 Official Eastern Football League website

Eastern Football League (Australia) clubs
Australian rules football clubs established in 1978
1978 establishments in Australia
Sport in the Shire of Yarra Ranges